David Luteijn (11 July 1943 – 13 April 2022) was a Dutch engineer and politician who served as a Senator.

References

1943 births
2022 deaths
Dutch engineers
20th-century Dutch politicians
Members of the Senate (Netherlands)
People's Party for Freedom and Democracy politicians
People from Sluis
Knights of the Order of Orange-Nassau
Knights of the Order of the Netherlands Lion
Officers of the Order of Leopold II